H300 may stand for:

 Iriver H300 series of portable audible players
 Toyota HiAce (H300) light commercial van
 Hyundai H300 light commercial van
 Qiling H300 light truck, manufactured by Dorcen
 H300, GHS hazard statement code for "Fatal if swallowed"